Maria Alekseyevna Lvova-Belova (born 25 October 1984) is a Russian politician serving as the Presidential Commissioner for Children's Rights in Russia since 2021.

On 17 March 2023, the International Criminal Court issued an arrest warrant alleging unlawful deportation of children from Ukraine to Russia during the 2022 Russian invasion of Ukraine.

Career 

Born and raised in Penza, Lvova-Belova graduated from the A. A. Arkhangelsky College of Culture and Arts in 2002 as a conductor. From 2000 to 2005, she worked as a guitar teacher at children's music schools in Penza. She cofounded and headed the Penza regional public organization for promoting social adaptation "Blagovest." From 2011 to 2014 and 2017 to 2019, she was a member of the Civic Chamber of Penza Oblast, the latter term overlapping one in the Civic Chamber of the Russian Federation. In 2019, she was elected co-chair of the All-Russia People's Front regional headquarters.

In 2019, Lvova-Belova joined the United Russia party (the ID card was given to her on 23 November by Prime Minister Dmitry Medvedev). On 24 November, she was elected to the Presidium of the General Council of the United Russia, and she became the co-chair of the working group to support civil society. In September 2020, reelected governor of Penza Oblast Ivan Belozertsev appointed her to the Federation Council of Russia from Penza Oblast's executive branch. After the 2021 snap election, she was reappointed by Oleg Melnichenko.

On 27 October 2021, Russian president Vladimir Putin appointed Senator Maria Lvova-Belova as the federal Commissioner for Children's Rights, one month after previous commissioner Anna Kuznetsova became an MP.

Lvova-Belova was accused by Ukrainian and British officials of supervising the forcible deportation and adoption of children from Ukraine during the 2022 Russian invasion of Ukraine. Following the invasion, she was sanctioned by the United Kingdom in June 2022, by the European Union in July 2022, by the United States in September 2022, and by Japan in January 2023.

A warrant for Lvova-Belova's arrest was issued by the International Criminal Court on 17 March 2023, which claims she is responsible for the unlawful deportation of children from Ukraine to Russia during the invasion; a similar warrant was issued for Putin.

Personal life 
Lvova-Belova has been married to Pavel Kogelman, a priest of the Russian Orthodox Church and formerly a programmer, since 2003. They have five biological and eighteen adopted children. The former were born in 2005, 2007, 2010, 2014 and 2018. In February 2023, she adopted a 15-year-old boy from Mariupol, which The Moscow Times said would likely spark outrage due to the concurrent deportation program.

See also
Elizaveta Glinka, Russian humanitarian worker who moved Ukrainian children to Russia during the War in Donbass

References

External links
 

1984 births
20th-century Russian women
21st-century Russian women politicians
Fugitives wanted by the International Criminal Court
Living people
Members of the Federation Council of Russia (after 2000)
Ombudsmen in Russia
People from Penza
People indicted for war crimes
Fugitives wanted on war crimes charges
People of the 2022 Russian invasion of Ukraine
Russian individuals subject to European Union sanctions
People indicted for crimes against humanity
Fugitives wanted on crimes against humanity charges
Russian individuals subject to the U.S. Department of the Treasury sanctions
Russian individuals subject to United Kingdom sanctions
Russian Orthodox Christians from Russia
Specially Designated Nationals and Blocked Persons List
United Russia politicians
People indicted by the International Criminal Court